The following is a list of concept vehicles by German carmaker Porsche, a subsidiary of Volkswagen Group. As of September 2021, a total of 49 Porsche concepts have been revealed. 15 concepts remained unrevealed until November 11, 2020, the publish date of the Porsche Unseen, a book about the unrevealed Porsche concept vehicles from the years 2005 to 2019.

 530 (1953), a four-seat sedan for Studebaker 
 542 (1953), a four-seat sedan for Studebaker
 55One (2008, unrevealed), a roadster
 633 (1961), a rear-engine, four seat subcompact sedan for Studebaker
 904 Living Legend (2013, unrevealed), a sports car
 906 Living Legend (2005, unrevealed), a racing-inspired supercar
 908-04 (2017), a race car
 911 3.2 Speedster ClubSport (1987), a speedster
 911 four-door prototype (1967), a sports car-based sedan
 911 B17 (1969), a fastback sports car
 911 HLS (1966), a sports car
 911 Roadster (1966, Geneva), a roadster
 911 Speedster concept (2018, Paris), a speedster
 911 Vision Safari (2012, unrevealed), a sports car-based rally car
 917 Living Legend (2019), a racing-inspired supercar
 918 RSR (2011, Detroit), a racing-inspired supercar
 918 Spyder concept (2010, Geneva), a spyder
 919 Street (2017, unrevealed), a supercar
 928 four-door prototype (1987), a 5-door shooting brake
 969 (1988), a sports car
 984 (1984), a roadster
 984 Junior (1984), a roadster
 989 (1989), a mid-size sedan
 Boxster concept (1993, Detroit), a roadster
 Boxster Bergspyder (2014, unrevealed), a racing-inspired speedster
 C88 (1994, Beijing), a compact sedan
 Carrera GT concept (2000, Paris), a spyder
 Cayenne Cabriolet (2002), a 3-door mid-size SUV-based cabriolet
 Cayman GT4 Clubsport (2018, ADAC Rallye Deutschland), a sports car-based rally car
 Concept Meteor, a 5-door mid-size fastback
 Concept Mirage, a 5-door mid-size fastback
 Concept Phantom, a 5-door mid-size fastback
 FLA (1973, Frankfurt), an experimental 3-door compact hatchback
 Le Mans Living Legend (2016, unrevealed), a racing-inspired sports car
 Macan Vision Safari (2013, unrevealed), a 3-door compact SUV
 Mission E (2015, Frankfurt), a mid-size sedan
 Mission E Cross Turismo (2018, Geneva), a mid-size crossover station wagon
 Porsche Mission R (2021, Munich), a race car
 Murene (1970, Paris), a sports car
 Panamera Sport Turismo (2012, Paris), a mid-size station wagon
 Panamericana (1989, Frankfurt), a sports car
 Tapiro (1970, Turin), a sports car
 Typ 754 T7 (1959), a sports car
 Type 580, a 2-door coupe
 Varrera (1988), a compact MPV
 Vision 916 (2016, unrevealed), a sports car
 Vision 918 RS (2019, unrevealed), a supercar
 Vision 920 (2019, unrevealed), a race car
 Vision E (2019, unrevealed), a race car
 Vision Renndienst (2018, unrevealed), racing-inspired cargo van
 Vision Spyder (2019, unrevealed), a spyder
 Vision Turismo (2016, unrevealed), a mid-size sedan

References

External links
 Porsche concept vehicles